Thuzar Wint Lwin (born 18 October 1998), also known as Candy Thuzar, is a Burmese model, activist, and beauty pageant titleholder who was crowned Miss Universe Myanmar 2020. She represented Myanmar at the Miss Universe 2020 pageant, where she placed in the Top 21 and won the Best National Costume award, becoming the first representative of Myanmar to place in the competition.

As a beauty pageant titleholder, Thuzar Wint Lwin became a political activist for the pro-democracy movement in Myanmar, participating in protests and demonstrations and raising awareness against the military junta and 2021 coup d'état. As a result of her activism, the Burmese military junta put out an arrest warrant for Thuzar Wint Lwin, and she received asylum in the United States.

Early life and education
Thuzar Wint Lwin was born on 18 October 1998 in Yangon. At the time of winning Miss Universe Myanmar, Thuzar Wint Lwin was a student studying English at East Yangon University. She is the youngest child among three siblings, having an older brother and a sister, May, who is a Burmese actress and singer.

Pageantry

Miss Universe Myanmar 2020
On 30 December 2020, Thuzar Wint Lwin was crowned as Miss Universe Myanmar 2020 by outgoing titleholder Swe Zin Htet. During the competition, she represented the Burmese city of Hakha within Chin State. Thuzar Wint Lwin also won four special awards at Miss Universe Myanmar including Miss Photogenic, Miss Healthy Skin, Miss Dentiste Award, and Best in Evening Gown Award.

Miss Universe 2020
As Miss Universe Myanmar, Thuzar Wint Lwin received the right to represent Myanmar at Miss Universe 2020. Originally slated for the winter of 2020, the pageant was postponed due to the COVID-19 pandemic to spring 2021, where it was held in Hollywood, Florida. Several months before the pageant was held, the 2021 Myanmar coup d'état occurred, which saw a military junta deposing of the democratically elected National League for Democracy government and its leader Aung Sang Suu Kyi. Following this, advocating for the Burmese pro-democracy movement became Thuzar Wint Lwin's platform within the competition.
After arriving to the competition, Thuzar Wint Lwin's luggage was lost, including all of her outfits and her national costume. She later had an alternate national costume created within a matter of days by members of the Burmese American community, based on the ethnic costume of the Chin people. In the national costume contest, Thuzar Wint Lwin held a sign that read "Pray for Myanmar", alluding to the 2021 coup d'état, which garnered international media attention. She went on to win the Best National Costume award, the second time that Myanmar has won this award. Thuzar Wint Lwin later went on to place in the Top 21 of the competition, becoming the first Burmese representative to place at Miss Universe.

Political activism
Immediately following the 2021 Myanmar coup d'état, Thuzar Wint Lwin became an activist for the Myanmar pro-democracy movement, through both participating in rallies and online social media activism. Thuzar Wint Lwin also became affiliated with the We Want Justice three-finger salute movement, which was launched on social media and saw several Burmese celebrities participating.

Following Miss Universe 2020, where Thuzar Wint Lwin advocated for the pro-democracy movement on international television, an arrest warrant was announced by the military junta. Following the arrest warrant, Thuzar Wint Lwin was granted asylum in the United States, settling in Indianapolis, Indiana with the local Burmese American community. In August 2021, she moved to London after signing with a British modeling agency.

References

External links

1998 births
Burmese beauty pageant winners
Burmese democracy activists
Burmese expatriates in the United Kingdom
Burmese female models
Burmese women activists
Fugitives wanted by Myanmar
Living people
Miss Universe 2020 contestants
Miss Universe Myanmar winners
People from Yangon
Political refugees in the United States